Qingdao Technical College is a public college based in Huangdao District of Qingdao, Shandong province, China. It was founded in 1951 and has an enrollment of around 9000 students.

External links
 Qingdao Technical College website 
 Qingdao Technical College website 

Universities and colleges in Qingdao
Educational institutions established in 1951
1951 establishments in China